David Gibbs Lloyd (July 7, 1934 – November 10, 2009) was an American screenwriter and producer for television.

He wrote for many sitcoms, such as The Mary Tyler Moore Show, The Bob Newhart Show, Taxi, Cheers, Frasier and Wings. Lloyd wrote "Chuckles Bites the Dust", an October 1975 episode of the Mary Tyler Moore Show, for which he won the Emmy Award for Outstanding Writing in a Comedy Series.

Family
Lloyd was married to Arline. The couple had five children, television writers Stephen and Christopher, as well as  Julie, Amy, and Douglas.

Death
He died on November 10, 2009, aged 75, from prostate cancer at his home in Beverly Hills, California.

The November 18, 2009, episode of Modern Family (which was co-created by his son Christopher), "Great Expectations", on ABC ended with an "In Memory" screen dedicating the episode to David's life.

Filmography
The Tonight Show Starring Johnny Carson (1963-1970) 
The Dick Cavett Show (1970-1973) 
Jack Paar Tonite (1973) 
Bob & Carol & Ted & Alice (1973) (TV)
The Mary Tyler Moore Show (1973-1977) 
Doc (1975) 
Phyllis (1975-1977) 
The Tony Randall Show (1976) 
The Bob Newhart Show (1976-1977) 
The Betty White Show (1976-1977) 
Lou Grant (1977-1982) 
Rhoda (1978) 
The Associates (1979-1980) 
Taxi (1979-1983) 
Number 96 (1980) 
Best of the West (1982) 
Cheers (1982-1993) 
Mr. Smith (1982)  
At Your Service (1984) 
Brothers (1984-1989) 
Moscow Bureau (1985)
Mr. Sunshine (1986)
Amen (1986) 
Mr. President (1987) 
Dear John (1988) 
Wings  (1990-1995) 
Frasier (1994-2001)

References

External links

1934 births
2009 deaths
American male screenwriters
Television producers from New York (state)
Deaths from cancer in California
Deaths from prostate cancer
Primetime Emmy Award winners
People from Bronxville, New York
People from Greater Los Angeles
Yale University alumni
Writers from New York (state)
American television writers
American male television writers
Screenwriters from New York (state)
20th-century American male writers
20th-century American screenwriters